Aigrefeuille may refer to several communes in France:
 Aigrefeuille, Haute-Garonne
 Aigrefeuille-d'Aunis, Charente-Maritime
 Aigrefeuille-sur-Maine, Loire-Atlantique